Jason Edward Repko (born December 27, 1980) is an American former professional baseball outfielder. He played in Major League Baseball (MLB) for the Los Angeles Dodgers, Minnesota Twins and Boston Red Sox.

High school years
Repko attended Hanford High School in Richland, Washington, and was a letterman in baseball. As a senior, he posted a .581 batting average with 18 home runs and 14 stolen bases. He also clocked a 94 MPH fastball from the mound. A High School All-American infielder, he was drafted by the Los Angeles Dodgers in the 1st round of the 1999 Major League Baseball Draft, Repko skipped his high school graduation ceremony and passed on a scholarship with San Diego State University to sign with the Dodgers.

Career

Los Angeles Dodgers

He started his professional career as a shortstop with the rookie league Great Falls Dodgers, hitting .304 with 8 homers and 12 steals and being selected to the Pioneer League All-Star Team.

Healthy for the  season, the Dodgers had him switch positions from shortstop, where he had played previously, to center field while playing for the Vero Beach Dodgers. Repko hit .272 for Vero Beach, with 9 homers and 29 steals that season and was selected to the Florida State League All-Star team.

He made his MLB debut on April 6, against the San Francisco Giants. He singled off Jason Christiansen in the sixth inning for his first major league hit.  His first major league home run came on April 10 in Arizona off Óscar Villarreal and homered in his first at bat at Dodger Stadium on April 12 against the Giants. He hit .221 with 8 home runs and 30 RBIs for the Dodgers in 2005, playing in 129 games.

In , he was off to a fast start, but suffered a high ankle sprain and missed  months, returning to the Dodgers on July 24. Repko never received much playing time after returning, buried behind the outfield rotation of J. D. Drew, Kenny Lofton, Andre Ethier, Marlon Anderson, and Matt Kemp.

Earlier in the game he collided with Rafael Furcal, sidelining Furcal and causing a severe ankle injury that hampered Furcal all season.

He appeared in 22 games at the end of the season with the Dodgers after spending the majority of the season in AAA with Las Vegas.

In 2009, he played with the AAA Albuquerque Isotopes and then appeared in 10 games with the Dodgers in September, primarily as a pinch runner or late inning defensive replacement.

On March 31, 2010, Repko was released by the Dodgers and became a free agent.

Minnesota Twins
On April 6, 2010, Repko signed a minor league deal with the Minnesota Twins. He was called up to the Twins on June 24.

Boston Red Sox
He signed with the Boston Red Sox on a minor league contract with an invitation to spring training in 2012. Repko started the season in Triple A Pawtucket before being called up April 15 due to the injuries of Carl Crawford and Jacoby Ellsbury.

Independent Leagues
Repko signed with the York Revolution of the Atlantic League of Professional Baseball for the 2013 season and played with them in 2014 also. In 2015, he signed with the Sioux Falls Canaries of the American Association of Independent Professional Baseball.

Bridgeport Bluefish
Repko signed with the Bridgeport Bluefish of the Atlantic League of Professional Baseball for the 2016 season. He was traded to the York Revolution. He retired while a member of the Revolution in 2016.

References

External links

Report on Repko returning from the Disabled List and attitude about injury

1980 births
Living people
Los Angeles Dodgers players
Minnesota Twins players
Boston Red Sox players
Baseball players from Indiana
Major League Baseball outfielders
Sportspeople from East Chicago, Indiana
Great Falls Dodgers players
Yakima Bears players
Wilmington Waves players
Vero Beach Dodgers players
Jacksonville Suns players
Las Vegas 51s players
Albuquerque Isotopes players
Rochester Red Wings players
Pawtucket Red Sox players
Greenville Drive players
York Revolution players
Sioux Falls Canaries players